Carl Henrik Langebaek Rueda (Bogotá, 1961) is a Colombian anthropologist, archaeologist and historian. He has been contributing on the knowledge of archaeological evidences, especially the Herrera Period and the Muisca. Langebaek was vice-chancellor for academic affairs at Universidad de los Andes and speaks Spanish and English.

Biography 
Carl Henrik Langebaek Rueda was born in the Colombian capital Bogotá as son of a Danish father, also an anthropologist, and Colombian mother. He attended the Gimnasio Moderno in the city. Langebaek did his undergraduate studies in anthropology at the Universidad de Los Andes from 1980 to 1985 and his Master's from 1988 to 1993 at the University of Pittsburgh, graduating with a thesis called Regional Archaeology in the Muisca Territory. The case of Fúquene and Susa. During the same years Langebaek performed his doctoral publishing his PhD thesis in 1993 under the title Patterns of Coca consumptions in Northern South America. The anthropologist has spent eight years in the archives looking for information on the indigenous peoples he assessed in his work.

Since 1992 Langebaek is associate professor at the Universidad de Los Andes in Bogotá and from 2000 to 2011 he was the dean of the Faculty of Social Sciences of the university.

Langebaek has worked in National Park Tayrona, Fúquene Valley, Barichara, Bahía de Neguaje and north Ecuador and his heroes are Charles Darwin and Niels Bohr.

Carl Henrik Langebaek has stated that agriculture and the hunter-gatherer society are not mutually exclusive and while the access to agriculture is there, the society can continue living off hunter-gathering techniques. The potato and maize are not originally from Colombia, yet from Peru and Mexico respectively and were cultivated on the Altiplano Cundiboyacense during the Herrera Period, around 3000 BP (1000 BCE).

In 2009 the Premio Alejandro Ángel Escobar en Ciencias Sociales y Humanas was awarded to Langebaek for his book Los herederos del pasado. Indígenas y pensamiento criollo en Colombia y Venezuela.

Works 
This list is a selection.

Books 

 2021 - Antes de Colombia
2019 - "Los muiscas. La historia milenaria de un pueblo chibcha"
 2009 - Los herederos del pasado : indígenas y pensamiento criollo en Colombia y Venezuela
 2007 - Indios y españoles en la antigua provincia de Santa Marta, Colombia: documentos de los siglos XVI y XVII
 2006 - El diablo vestido de negro y los cunas del Darién en el siglo XVIII: Jacobo Walburger y su Breve noticia de la provincia del Darién, de la ley y costumbres de los yndios, de la poca esperanza de plantar nuestra fé, y del número de sus naturales, 1748
 2002 - Arqueología y guerra en el Valle de Aburrá: estudio de cambios sociales en una región del noroccidente del Colombia
 2000 - Arqueología en el Bajo Magdalena: un estudio de los primeros agricultores del Caribe colombiano
 1998 - Medio ambiente y poblamiento en La Guajira : investigaciones arqueológicas en el ranchería medio
 1996 - Noticias de caciques muy mayores: orígen y desarrollo de sociedades complejas en el nororiente de Colombia y norte de Venezuela
 1995 - Regional archaeology in the Muisca territory: a study of the Fúquene and Susa valleys
 1992 - Noticias de caciques mayores: Origen y desarrollo de sociedades complejas en el nororiente de Colombia y el norte de Venezuela
 1987 - Mercados, poblamiento e integración étnica entre los muiscas, siglo XVI
 1985 - Cuando los muiscas diversificaron la agricultura y crearon el intercambio

Articles 
 2005 - The Pre-Hispanic Population of the Santa Marta Bays. A Contribution to the Study of the Development of the Northern Colombian Tairona Chiefdom
 2001 - Arqueología regional en el Valle de Leiva: procesos de ocupación humana en una región de los Andes orientales de Colombia
 2000 - Cacicazgos, orfebrería y política prehispánica: una perspectiva desde Colombia
 1996 - Arqueología de nosotros mismos. Deterioro ambiental en la laguna de Fúquene
 1996 - De cómo convertir a los indios y de porqué no lo han sido: Juan de Valcarcel y la idolatría en el altiplano cundiboyacense a finales del siglo XVII
 1994 - La élite no siempre piensa lo mismo. Indígenas, estado, arqueología y etnohistoria en Colombia
 1992 - Cuna Chiefs long distance travels: the result of the Conquest
 1992 - El uso de adornos de metal y la existencia de sociedades complejas: una visión desde Centro de Suramérica
 1992 - Competencia por el prestigio político y momificación en el norte de Suramérica y el Istmo, siglo XVI
 1990 - Patologías y la hipótesis de la economía autosuficiente muisca
 1990 - Buscando Sacerdotes y encontrando chuques: sobre la organización religiosa de los cacicazgos muiscas

See also 

List of Muisca scholars
Muisca
tunjo
El Infiernito

References

Notable works by Langebaek Rueda

External links 
 

1961 births
Colombian anthropologists
Colombian archaeologists
20th-century Colombian historians
Muisca scholars
University of Pittsburgh alumni
Academic staff of the University of Los Andes (Colombia)
Living people
21st-century Colombian historians